Shabir Ahluwalia (born 10 August 1979) is an Indian actor and host. He is  known for portraying Abhishek Prem Mehra in Kumkum Bhagya. Apart from this, Ahluwalia has acted in Kyunki Saas Bhi Kabhi Bahu Thi (2002), Kya Hadsaa Kya Haqeeqat (2004), Kahi To Milenge (2002), Kkavyanjali (2005), Kasamh Se (2006), Kasautii Zindagii Kay (2006), Kayamath (2007), Laagi Tujhse Lagan (2011) and many more. He won the third season of Fear Factor: Khatron Ke Khiladi and hosted Nach Baliye, Guinness World Records – Ab India Todega and Dancing Queen. He made his debut in Bollywood with Shootout at Lokhandwala. His second film was Mission Istanbul. He will be doing a special appearance in the upcoming film, Tiger 3.

Life and family

Shabir Ahluwalia was born on 10 August 1979 to a Sikh father and a Catholic mother in Mumbai. He has two siblings Shefali Ahluwalia and Sameer Ahluwalia. He did his schooling from St. Xavier's High School, Vile Parle. He completed his graduation from University of Maryland, College Park.

He married his girlfriend, actress Kanchi Kaul on 27 November 2011. In 2014 they had a son, and in 2016, they had another son.

Filmography

Films

Television

Web series

Awards and nominations

See also 

 List of Indian television actors

References

External links

University of Maryland, College Park alumni
Punjabi people
Indian male film actors
Male actors in Hindi cinema
Indian television presenters
Living people
Indian male soap opera actors
Indian Sikhs
1979 births
Fear Factor: Khatron Ke Khiladi participants
Actors from Mumbai
Ahluwalia